Bole Senior High School is a second cycle school in Bole in the Bole District in the Savannah Region of Ghana. The current headmasters are Mr Albertos Mahama and Reverend Father Corlenius Begua Termaghre.

History 
The school was established in 1979.

References 

Savannah Region (Ghana)
High schools in Ghana